USA-241, also known as SBIRS GEO-2, is a United States military satellite and part of the Space-Based Infrared System.

Overview 
The SBIRS satellites are a replacement for the Defense Support Program early warning system. They are intended to detect ballistic missile launches, as well as various other events in the infrared spectrum, including nuclear explosions, aircraft flights, space object entries and reentries, wildfires and spacecraft launches.

Satellite description 
SBIRS-GEO 2 was manufactured by Lockheed Martin Space and is built upon the A2100M satellite bus.

Launch 
SBIRS GEO-2 was launched on 19 March 2013 from Cape Canaveral, atop an Atlas V launch vehicle.

Mission 
In October 2013, the satellite was incorporated into the United States early warning network.

References 

Spacecraft launched in 2013
Reconnaissance satellites of the United States
USA satellites
Early warning satellites